Mark Gornall (born 25 October 1961) is a British former cyclist. He competed in the road race at the 1988 Summer Olympics.

References

External links
 

1961 births
Living people
British male cyclists
Olympic cyclists of Great Britain
Cyclists at the 1988 Summer Olympics
Sportspeople from Preston, Lancashire